The 2015–16 Lafayette Leopards women's basketball team represented Lafayette College during the 2015–16 NCAA Division I women's basketball season. The Leopards, led by first year head coach Theresa Grentz, played their home games at Kirby Sports Center and were members of the Patriot League. They finished the season 6–23, 4–14 in Patriot League play to finish in a tie for eighth place. They lost in the first round of the Patriot League women's tournament to Colgate.

Roster

Schedule

|-
!colspan=9 style="background:#800000; color:#000000;"| Non-conference regular season

|-
!colspan=9 style="background:#800000; color:#000000;"| Patriot League regular season

|-
!colspan=9 style="background:#800000; color:#000000;"| Patriot League Women's Tournament

See also
 2015–16 Lafayette Leopards men's basketball team

References

Lafayette
Lafayette Leopards women's basketball seasons
Lafayette
Lafayette